Marie Courcelles (fl. 1562 – fl. 1583) was a Scottish court official.  She served as lady-in-waiting to Mary, Queen of Scots.

Life
She arrived to Scotland from France in 1562 to become a lady-in-waiting to queen Mary. She was not the only French lady-in-waiting: nine accompanied the queen from France in 1561 under the supervision of her French chamberlain, Servais de Condé: Guyonne de Péguillon; Marie Pyerres (Madame de Briante), Joanne de la Reyneville (Lady Creich), Isabelle Camp (Demoiselle de Cobron) and Suzanne Constant (Demoiselle de Fonterpuys), as well as seven maids-of-honour under a governess, Madamoiselle de la Souche.

In May 1562 the queen bought Courcelles, described as one of her "chamber women" shoes, linen, black taffeta for a skirt, and a farthingale. In January 1563 she was described as a "maiden in the Queen's chamber" and given a black velvet gown with another farthingale. In June 1566 she was "maiden and femme" in the Queen's chamber and was given silk chamlet and velvet for her clothes. When Mary gave linen to her household for Easter in 1567, Courcelle was named in the account among the "femmes de chambre", the chamber women, rather than one of the ladies or maidens. Toussaint Courcelles, a valet in the Queen's chamber, was probably her brother. Claude de Courcelles, a diplomat and secretary of the French ambassador in London Michel de Castelnau, was probably a relation.

When the queen was imprisoned at Lochleven, Marie Courcelles was one of the three ladies-in-waiting who accompanied her there (the other two being Mary Seton and Jane Kennedy). Marie Courcelles played a role in the queen's escape. She reportedly took part in planning the escape along with George Douglas and Willie Douglas. On Sunday 2 May 1568, it was she who received the keys from Willie Douglas and brought the queen to the postern gate where a boat was waiting for them with an escort. When the queen escaped from Lochleven Marie Courcelles stayed behind with Mary Seton. 

She joined Queen Mary in exile at Sheffield Castle. A list of Queen Mary's household made when she was at Coventry in November 1569 notes that Courcelles and Mary Bruce, a daughter of the Laird of Airth, slept in the queen's bedchamber.

The queen requested that she might retire and return to France in December 1581. She renewed the request in April 1583.

It has been suggested that she accompanied Mary Seton to Reims on her retirement in 1583.

See also
 Mademoiselle Rallay

References 

16th-century births
Scottish ladies-in-waiting
Court of Mary, Queen of Scots